Kanfei Nesharim (Hebrew: , 'Wings of Eagles') may refer to:

 Operation Magic Carpet (Yemen), the 1949–1950 operation to airlift Yemenite Jews to Israel
 Kanfei Nesharim Street, in western Jerusalem
 Kanfei Nesharim, a commentary on the Pentateuch by Rabbi Abraham Lichtstein

See also 
 Kanaf
 Nesher
 Nasr (name)